Beth Ann Winkelstein is the Interim Provost and the Eduardo D. Glandt President’s Distinguished Professor at the University of Pennsylvania. Winkelstein has established an active research program that is recognized for elucidating the mechanisms of subfailure cervical spine injuries and the cellular events surrounding the etiology of chronic pain.  She is further recognized for longstanding contributions to the discipline of biomechanics and for mentoring many students that have followed into research active careers.

Early life and education
Winkelstein received her BSE in bioengineering from the University of Pennsylvania in 1993 before going on to earn her doctorate in biomedical engineering from Duke University in 1999. After completing a postdoctoral fellowship at Dartmouth College, she joined the faculty at the University of Pennsylvania in 2002.

Career
Winkelstein joined the University of Pennsylvania faculty in 2002 and received tenure and promotion to Associate Professor in 2007. She earned a promotion to Full Professor in 2011 and became a Bioengineering Graduate Group Chair. She was also chosen to edit "Orthopaedic Biomechanics." By 2015, Winkelstein was appointed vice provost for education at UPenn and was elected to sit on the Biomedical Engineering Society Board of Directors. In 2006, Winkelstein was recognized by the American Society of Mechanical Engineers with the Y.C. Fung Young Investigator Award for her research in Bioengineering and demonstration of potential to make substantial contributions to the field of Bioengineering. 

Winkelstein has led a large multi-disciplinary research program that uses experimental biomechanical measures of fracture and injury to study problems of importance in head, neck and spine injury.  Winkelstein has been honored for her contributions to the scientific literature with an NIH Research Career Award in 2002, a Whitaker Foundation Young Investigator Research Award in 2003, an NSF Career Award in 2006, and the Van C. Mow Medal.

Winkelstein served as Co-Editor in Chief of the ASME Journal of Biomechanical Engineering from 2013-2020.  

She was honored with election to Fellow of ASME in 2012 and Fellow AIMBE in 2013.

In 2018, Winkelstein was elected as a councilor to the World Council of Biomechanics, for which she has been a Session or Track Chair for World Congress of Biomechanics in 2022 and 2018.   Later, she was appointed the Eduardo D. Glandt President’s Distinguished Professor and Interim Provost.

Controversies

In 2022, a grievance signed by multiple university faculty members was submitted to the University of Pennsylvania alleging that Winkelstein violated university procedures with "arbitrary and capricious" conduct in defaming Mackenzie Fierceton, one of the university's own students.

References

External links 
 

Living people
Place of birth missing (living people)
Year of birth missing (living people)
American women academics
University of Pennsylvania faculty
Duke University alumni
American women non-fiction writers
American bioengineers
American women scientists
21st-century American women